Abū Muḥammad ʿAbdallāh ibn Jaʿfar (ibn Muḥammad) ibn Durustawayh ibn al-Marzubān al-Fārisī al-Fasawī al-Naḥwī, best known as Ibn Durustawayh (born 872 – died May 958), was a Persian grammarian, lexicographer and student of the Quran and hadith. He was born in the Persian town of Fasa to Jaʿfar b. Durustawayh (died ), and died in Baghdad.

References

Sources
 
 

872 births
958 deaths
9th-century Iranian writers
10th-century Iranian writers
People from Fasa
Iranian grammarians
Iranian lexicographers